Footsies (also footsy or footsie) is a flirting game where two people touch feet under a table or otherwise concealed place, often as a romantic prelude. It is a game played either as an act of flirtatious body language, or simply for enjoyment. Although footsies is not inherently romantic, the nature of it as playful touching is often done between lovers as a sign of affection, and most often without discussion. The term comes from a 1940s humorous diminutive of foot.

Effects

In a 1994 study on secret relationships, participants (college students from the US) played a partnered card game in which a subset were instructed to play footsies with their card playing partner. Of these, individuals whose footsies was kept a secret rated the attractiveness of their partner significantly higher than either those who did not play footsies, or those whose footsies was publicly known.

Use in popular culture and medicine 
American comics author Robert Crumb published an autobiographic comic strip named "Footsy" in 1987 which deals with ″his teenager encounters with the feet of various lusty creatures at school″ and is a  "typically self-lacerating portrayal of one of Crumb's myriad sexual fetishes".

In training of the plantar fascia, a device called footsie roller is used for the foot.

The term "footsies" was coined by the fighting game community in reference to "the mid-range ground-based aspect of fighting game strategy." The word was likely chosen due to its similarity to a common strategy in fighting games whereby a player moves in and out of their opponent's striking range, uses fast, weak moves (such as crouching light kick) to bait their opponent into attacking, and subsequently punishes their whiffed attack.

References

Sexual attraction
Philosophy of love